This list of political parties in Thailand names current and disbanded Thai political parties.

Political parties

Currently represented in parliament

Parties not represented in parliament
Social Action Party
New Politics Party
New Aspiration Party, majority merged with the Thai Rak Thai Party in 2001, minority continued
Puea Pandin Party

New political parties founded after the 2014 military coup
 Future Forward Party
 Palang Pracharath Party
 Thai Civilized Party

Defunct parties
Khana Ratsadon (existed from 1927 to the 1940s) – first political party in Thailand
Liberal Democratic Party (disbanded in 1958)
Socialist Party of Thailand (most members joined the communists in 1976 and the party was disbanded)
Social Justice Party
Justice Unity Party
Palang Dharma Party (disbanded in 1996)
 Both of the following parties merged into Thais United National Development Party (Phak Ruam Jai Thai Chat Pattana) in 2007:
National Development Party (Phak Chat Pattana; founded in 1992)
Thais United (Ruam Jai Thai; founded in 2007)
New Force Party (disbanded in 1988)
Thai Pen Thai Party (Thais are Free Party) (disbanded in 2016)
 Social Action Party (disbanded in 2018)
 Thai Social Democratic Party

Banned or dissolved parties 
Parties dissolved by the Constitutional Court of Thailand and barred from political activity:
Communist Party of Thailand (existed from 1942 to the 1980s)
Thai Rak Thai Party (Phak Thai Rak Thai) – dissolved by the Constitutional Court of Thailand on 30 May 2007 for violating electoral laws
People's Power Party (Phak Palang Prachachon) – dissolved by the Constitutional Court of Thailand on 2 December 2008 for violating electoral laws
Thai Nation Party (Phak Chart Thai) – dissolved by the Constitutional Court of Thailand on 2 December 2008 for violating electoral laws
Neutral Democratic Party (Phak Matchima) – founded in 2006, dissolved by the Constitutional Court of Thailand on 2 December 2008 for violating electoral laws
Thai Raksa Chart Party (Phak Thai Raksa Chart) – founded in 2009, dissolved by the Constitutional Court of Thailand on 7 March 2019 for violating electoral laws
Future Forward Party (Abrv: FFP;) The party was dissolved on 21 February 2020 for fiscal impropriety.

See also
 Politics of Thailand
 List of political parties by country

References 

Thailand
 
Political parties
Poliutical parties
Thailand